The following is a list of Louisiana state forests.

See also
 List of U.S. National Forests

Louisiana
State forests